Arthur Beachill (21 May 1905 – 12 April 1943) was an English footballer who played in the Football League for Millwall and Stoke City.

Career
Beachill was born in Monk Bretton and played football for his work side at the nearby mill. He signed for Rotherham County but failed to make an impact and played for Frickley Colliery. He was then given a chance with Stoke City and after three seasons in the reserves he forced his way into the first team and didn't miss a match in 1931–32. He then played 38 times in 1932–33 as Stoke won the Second Division title. He was often described as unhurried, fluent in both feet and one who was able to consistently play at his best.

After one season playing in the First Division with Stoke he was allowed to join London club, Millwall where he spent the 1934–35 season. Afterwards he returned to Stoke-on-Trent and decided to join the local foundry. He died of a heart attack walking home from work and the coroner put his death down to overstrain.

Career statistics
Source:

Honours
with Stoke City
Football League Second Division Champions: 1932–33
Football League Third Division North Champions: 1926–27

References

English footballers
Millwall F.C. players
Frickley Athletic F.C. players
Rotherham County F.C. players
Stoke City F.C. players
English Football League players
1905 births
1943 deaths
Association football defenders